1996 Emperor's Cup Final was the 76th final of the Emperor's Cup competition. The final was played at National Stadium in Tokyo on January 1, 1997. Verdy Kawasaki won the championship.

Overview
Verdy Kawasaki won their 4th title, by defeating Sanfrecce Hiroshima 3–0  with Tsuyoshi Kitazawa, Yasutoshi Miura and Keisuke Kurihara goal.

Match details

See also
1996 Emperor's Cup

References

Emperor's Cup
1996 in Japanese football
Tokyo Verdy matches
Sanfrecce Hiroshima matches